The New Adventures of Blinky Bill was an Australian-live action series that featured actors, interacting with puppets that ran on ABC Television from 1984 to 1987. After production ended, it remained on air in repeats until 1991. Twenty-eight 26 minute episodes were made and the producers were Judith Simpson and Richard Smith.

Plot

The show was a follow on from the original Blinky Bill books by Dorothy Wall. Set in the fictional Bollygum National Park, characters include Blinky Bill, Mrs Magpie, Angelina Wallaby and Walter Wombat from the books, and new characters such as Charlie Goanna, Eric Echidna, Sybilla Snake and Kerry Bill Koala from the neighbouring fictional Acadia Ridge park.

Main cast

Guest artists
Most episodes also featured at least one Australian actor in a guest actor in a human character roleBenita CollingsMaggie KirkpatrickPaul ChubbDavid WatersJackie WoodburneMike MeadeJoanne Samuel and many others.

Episode list

Season 1 (1984)
Hello Stranger, Goodbye Ranger
Ho-Ha at Bollygum
Musical Wares
Spaceship Shuttlecock

Season 2 (1985)
Stuck on Gumleaves
Frills and Feathers
High Water
Computer Capers
Mine Too!
Bikies from Outer Space

Season 3 (1986)
Rock 'n' Roll Blues
Legend in his Own Lunchtime
Times Flies When You're Feeling Young
Blinky Hits The Jackpot
Not a Minute's Peace
Twice Bitten
The Visitor
Food For Thought

Season 4 (1987)
Say Snake
Hot Wheels
A Time of Testing
Operation Gumdrops
Media Wars
April Fools
School's In
Brush With Danger
Horseplay
Diplomatic Relations

Puppets

The series was unique for its production style. The puppets were designed and made by the late Beverley Campbell-Jackson, who chose to use a thick and fluffy yarn to knit the outer skin of the marsupial characters, which gave them their furry look on camera. Charlie's skin was made from a patterned lurex which gave him a distinctive look in sunlight. She designed internal mechanisms which used triggers to control the movements of each character's head, mouth and eyelids; while rods to each hand controlled arm movements. Each puppeteer used one hand for the trigger mechanism, and one hand to control both arm rods (this skill is somewhat like advanced chopsticks technique). Similar techniques are seen in some forms of Japanese puppetry.

Production
At the time of shooting, the ABC network owned studios in the Sydney bush suburb of Frenchs Forest and the show was recorded using multi-camera and live sound recording on the back lot, with the puppeteers voicing the characters at the same time as operating the puppets. The only time that they would use one camera was the scenes with Blinky Bill and Charlie Goanna talking in Blinky's Tree. Ross Browning and Alan Highfield Blinky and Charlie's Puppeteers would bet on who could complete the scene the fastest. The Outside Broadcast unit provided crew, equipment and the control room. Some sets, including the ranger's hut and Walter Wombat's general store, were built permanently on location, while others were constructed as required for each episode. Sets were raised by a metre or so, to allow space underneath for puppeteers to stand or kneel. Only one scene – featuring a rock and roll performance by Blinky, Kerry and Charlie – was shot in a studio.

The puppet performers wrote roughly half the episodes. Other writers included Mike Meade (who wrote the pilot episode)Heather March, Mark Page and Morris Gleitzman, who is now a well-known author of children's books. Every time the ABC wanted to make another season, they had to ask permission from Angus & Robertson to shoot the next series of episodes.

In 1993, Blinky Bill returned to ABC television in the animated series, The Adventures of Blinky Bill, after which the ABC did not screen the puppet series again, a prospect that has become unlikely due to the conviction of Robert Hughes on sex offences.

References

External links
 The New Adventures of Blinky Bill at IMDb

Blinky Bill
Australian children's television series
Australian Broadcasting Corporation original programming
1984 Australian television series debuts
1987 Australian television series endings
Australian television shows featuring puppetry
Television series about koalas
Australian television shows based on children's books
English-language television shows

it:Blinky Bill